The 1993 Copa de S.M. la Reina de Fútbol was the 13th edition of Spain's women's football national cup. It was contested by 27 teams, and ran from 2 May to 26 June 1993. Añorga KKE defeated defending champion CD Oroquieta Villaverde in the final, held in Getafe, to win its third cup in four years.

Qualifying rounds

First preliminary round

Second preliminary round

Final rounds

References

Copa de la Reina
Women
1992-93